Professor "Leo" Cheung Kam Ching (張錦青, born 1963) is a philosopher in Hong Kong. He is a Professor of the Department of Philosophy, The Chinese University of Hong Kong (CUHK) since Jan 2011. He was a Professor of the Department of Religion and Philosophy, Hong Kong Baptist University (HKBU) from 2008–2011, Assistant Professor (1995–2000), Associate Professor (2000–2008) and the Head of Department (2006–2007). 
 
During his secondary education, Cheung attended St Francis Xavier's School Tsuen Wan. And then he attended the Department of Mathematics, Chinese University of Hong Kong and he gained his PhD at University of Sussex in 1993. His research interest is Wittgenstein's Philosophy, Philosophy of Language, Philosophy of Science, Chinese Philosophy and Comparative Philosophy.

Cheung gained The President's Award for Outstanding Performance in Teaching of HKBU at 2003; he also was a Visiting Scholarship to Faculty of Philosophy, University of Cambridge at 2003 and Visiting Fellowship to Harris Manchester College, University of Oxford at 2000.

|width=25% align=center|Preceded by:Professor Lo Ping Cheung
|width=25% align=center|Head, Department of Religion and philosophy, Hong Kong Baptist University2006–2007
|width=25% align=center|Succeeded by:Dr. Kai-man Kwan (Acting) 
|-

External links
 Website of the Department of Philosophy, CUHK

Cheung, Leo Kam Ching
Cheung, Leo Kam Ching
Academic staff of the Chinese University of Hong Kong
Cheung, Leo Kam Ching
Cheung, Leo Kam Ching
Fellows of Harris Manchester College, Oxford
1968 births
Living people